Year 1481 (MCDLXXXI) was a common year starting on Monday (link will display the full calendar) of the Julian calendar).

Events 
 January–December 
 May 3
 The 1481 Rhodes earthquake, the largest of a series, strikes the island of Rhodes, causing an estimated 30,000 casualties.
 Mehmed II, Sultan of the Ottoman Empire, dies and is succeeded by his son, Bayezid II.
 May 21 – Christian I, King of Denmark and Norway, dies and is succeeded by his son John (1481–1513).
 June 21 – The papal bull Aeterni Regis grants all land south of the Canary Islands to Portugal.
 July 24 – Fire destroys the roof and the spires of Reims Cathedral.
 August 29 – John II of Portugal starts to rule in his own right.
 September 10 – Alphonso II of Naples recaptures the city of Otranto.
 December 10 – With the death of Duke Charles IV of Anjou, Anjou reverts to the French crown under Louis XI of France.
 December 26 – Battle of Westbroek: Holland defeats the troops of Utrecht.

 Date unknown 
 The Constitució de l'Observança is approved by the Catalan Courts, establishing the submission of royal power to the laws of the Principality of Catalonia.
 Ludovico Sforza emerges as Regent of Milan (until 1499).
 Axayacatl, Aztec ruler of Tenochtitlan, dies and is succeeded by his brother Tízoc.
 The Aztec Calendar Stone or Sun Stone is carved.
 Fribourg and Solothurn become Cantons of Switzerland.

Births 
 January 15 – Ashikaga Yoshizumi, Japanese shōgun (d. 1511)
 March 2 – Franz von Sickingen, German knight (d. 1523)
 March 7 – Baldassare Peruzzi, Italian architect and painter (d. 1536)
 May 3 – Juana de la Cruz Vázquez Gutiérrez, Spanish abbess of the Franciscan Third Order Regular (d. 1534)
 May 14 – Ruprecht of the Palatinate, German bishop (d. 1504)
 July 1 – King Christian II of Denmark, Scandinavian monarch under the Kalmar Union (d. 1559)
 August 21 – Jorge de Lencastre, Duke of Coimbra (d. 1550)
 August 28 – Francisco de Sá de Miranda, Portuguese poet (d. 1558)
 November 11 – Christoph von Scheurl, German writer (d. 1542)
 December 18 – Sophie of Mecklenburg, Duchess of Mecklenburg, Duchess of Saxony (d. 1503)
 December 27 – Casimir, Margrave of Brandenburg-Bayreuth, Margrave of Bayreuth (d. 1527)
 date unknown
 Yan Song, Chinese prime minister (d. 1568)
 Antonio de Guevara, Spanish chronicler and moralist (d. 1545)
 Imperia La Divina, Roman courtesan (d. 1512)

Deaths 

 January 6 – Akhmat Khan, khan of the Great Horde
 April 30 – Ichijō Kaneyoshi, Japanese court noble (b. 1402)
 May 3 – Mehmed II, Ottoman Sultan (b. 1432)
 May – Karamanlı Mehmet Pasha, Ottoman (Turkish) grand vizier
 May 21 – King Christian I of Denmark and Norway (b. 1426)
 August 23 – Thomas de Littleton, English judge and legal author (b. c. 1407)
 August 28 – King Afonso V of Portugal (b. 1432)
 September 3 – Amalie of Brandenburg, Countess Palatine and Duchess of Zweibruecken and Veldenz (b. 1461)
 September 5 – John I, Duke of Cleves (b. 1419)
 November 19 – Anne de Mowbray, 8th Countess of Norfolk (b. 1472)
 date unknown
 Axayacatl, Aztec ruler of Tenochtitlan (b. c. 1449)
 Charles IV, Duke of Anjou, titular King of Naples (b. 1436)
 Jean Fouquet, French painter (b. 1420)
 Ikkyu, Japanese Zen Buddhist priest and poet (b. 1394)
 Mary Woodville, English noblewoman (b. c. 1454)
 Erik Axelsson Tott, regent of Sweden (b. 1415)

References